Alexander Lauder Davidson (27 September 1878 – 1929) was a Scottish footballer who played in the Football League for Glossop and Manchester City.

References

1878 births
1929 deaths
People from Armadale, West Lothian
Footballers from West Lothian
Scottish footballers
Association football forwards
Beith F.C. players
Third Lanark A.C. players
Glossop North End A.F.C. players
Manchester City F.C. players
Reading F.C. players
West Ham United F.C. players
Luton Town F.C. players
Fulham F.C. players
Gillingham F.C. players
Kilmarnock F.C. players
Aberdeen F.C. players
Swindon Town F.C. players
Stockport County F.C. players
Wigan Town A.F.C. players
Bolton Wanderers F.C. players
Nelson F.C. players
Macclesfield Town F.C. players
English Football League players